Meridian Knowledge Solutions is a software company founded in 1997 and headquartered in Reston, Virginia. It provides a web-based learning management system (LMS) for delivering and tracking training.  The company is a wholly owned subsidiary of Visionary Integration Professionals (VIP), a technology and outsourcing firm.

See also
 e-learning
 Knowledge management
 Knowledge management software
 Learning Management System
 List of learning management systems

References

External links
 Meridian website

Software companies based in Virginia
Educational technology companies of the United States
Companies established in 1997
American educational websites
Enterprise software
Learning management systems
Software companies of the United States
1997 establishments in the United States
1997 establishments in Virginia
Software companies established in 1997